The Washington Nationals' 2006 season was the franchise's second season in Washington, D.C. and 38th season overall.

The Nationals finished last in the NL East for the third consecutive year (counting their final season in Montreal), 26 games behind the New York Mets with a 71-91 record.

Offseason
On November 4, 2005, the Nationals traded Vinny Castilla to the San Diego Padres for Brian Lawrence. 
On December 8, 2005, they traded Brad Wilkerson, Terrmel Sledge, and minor leaguer Armando Galarraga to the Texas Rangers for  Alfonso Soriano. 
On December 24, 2005, they signed Mike Stanton – who they had traded to the Boston Red Sox late in the previous season – as a free agent. 
On February 11, 2006, the Nationals sold Jamey Carroll to the Colorado Rockies for $300,000,
On March 31, 2006, they sold Jim Crowell to the Philadelphia Phillies.

Advertising and marketing
The Nationals' marketing slogan for the season was "Make It Your Pastime." The slogan was a reference to the common saying that baseball is "the national pastime" in the United States.

Spring training
The Nationals held their 2006 spring training in Viera, Florida, with home games played at Space Coast Stadium.

Regular season

Groundbreaking for Nationals Park
On May 4, 2006, the groundbreaking ceremony took place for the Nationals' new ballpark, Nationals Park in Southeast Washington, D.C. Principal Owner Mark D. Lerner, Managing Principal Owner Theodore N. Lerner, Principal Owner Robert K. Tanenbaum, and Principal Owner Edward L. Cohen wielded the shovels at the ceremony; public address announcer Charlie Brotman emceed the event, and former Mayor of the District of Columbia Anthony A. Williams, former Nationals Manager Frank Robinson, representatives from Major League Baseball, the District of Columbia Sports and Entertainment Commission, the Anacostia Waterfront Corporation, and Clark-Hunt-Smoot Construction, and former Washington Senators and Homestead Grays players also attended. Less than two years later, the Nationals moved to Nationals Park for the 2008 season.

Beltway Series
During spring training in 2006, the Nationals and Orioles played each other in Washington on March 31 and in Baltimore on April 1. The first match-up of the regular-season Beltway Series rivalry took place on May 19, 2006, at Robert F. Kennedy Memorial Stadium; the Orioles won. This marked first time in 35 years that the Orioles played a regular-season game in Washington; previously, they had played the original Washington Senators of the American League annually from 1954 to 1960 and the expansion Washington Senators – which replaced the original Senators – each year from 1961 to 1971.

The two teams split the 2006 season series 3-3 with each team winning two games at home and one on the road.

Season standings

National League East

Record vs. opponents

Opening Day lineup

Notable transactions
July 13, 2006: The Nationals traded Gary Majewski, Royce Clayton, Bill Bray, Brendan Harris, and minor-leaguer Daryl Thompson to the Cincinnati Reds for Felipe López. Austin Kearns, and Ryan Wagner.
July 28, 2006: The Nationals traded Mike Stanton to the San Francisco Giants for minor-leaguer Shairon Martis.
August 7, 2006: The Nationals traded Liván Hernández and cash to the Arizona Diamondbacks for Matt Chico and Garrett Mock.
August 31, 2006: The Nationals traded Daryle Ward to the Atlanta Braves for minor-leaguer Luis Atilano and Marlon Anderson to the Los Angeles Dodgers for minor-leaguer Jhonny Núñez.
September 1, 2006: The Nationals received Nook Logan from the Detroit Tigers as part of a conditional deal.

Draft
The 2006 Major League Baseball First-Year Player Draft took place on June 6 and 7. With their first pick – the 15th pick overall – the Nationals selected outfielder Chris Marrero. Other notable players the Nationals selected were pitcher Cole Kimball (12th round, 361st overall), pitcher Sam Dyson (19th round, 571st overall), outfielder Khris Davis (29th round, 871st overall), first baseman Tyler Moore (33rd round, 991st overall), and pitcher Brad Peacock (41st round, 1,231st overall). The Nationals had drafted Moore in 2005, but he had not signed, and he did not sign again this year. Dyson and Davis also did not sign with the Nationals.

Roster

Attendance
The Nationals drew 2,153,056 fans at Robert F. Kennedy Memorial Stadium in 2006, placing them 11th in attendance for the season among the 16 National League teams.

Game log

|-  style="background:#fbb;"
| 1 || April 3 || @ New York Mets || 2-3 || Glavine (1-0) || Hernández (0-1) || Wagner (1) || 54,371 || 0-1
|-  style="background:#bfb;"
| 2 || April 5 || @ New York Mets || 9-5 || Cordero (1-0) || Julio (0-1) || || 19,557 || 1-1
|-  style="background:#fbb;"
| 3 || April 6 || @ New York Mets || 5-10 || Martínez (1-0) || Ortiz (0-1) || || 25,839 || 1-2
|-  style="background:#fbb;"
| 4 || April 7 || @ Houston Astros || 1-6 || Backe (1-0) || Armas (0-1) || || 26,978 || 1-3
|-  style="background:#bfb;"
| 5 || April 8 || @ Houston Astros || 12-8 || Hernández (1-1) || Qualls (0-1) || || 39,324 || 2-3
|-  style="background:#fbb;"
| 6 || April 9 || @ Houston Astros || 3-7 || Pettitte (1-1) || Drese (0-1) || || 31,662 || 2-4
|-  style="background:#fbb;"
| 7 || April 10 || @ Houston Astros || 4-5 || Qualls (1-1) || Stanton (0-1) || || 27,944 || 2-5
|-  style="background:#fbb;"
| 8 || April 11 || New York Mets || 1-7 || Bannister (1-0) || Ortiz (0-2) || || 40,516 || 2-6
|-  style="background:#fbb;"
| 9 || April 12 || New York Mets || 1-3 || Martínez (2-0) || Armas (0-2) || Wagner (2) || 29,986 || 2-7
|-  style="background:#fbb;"
| 10 || April 13 || New York Mets || 13-4 || Zambrano (1-0) || Hernández (1-2) || || 25,460 || 2-8
|-  style="background:#fbb;"
| 11 || April 14 || @ Florida Marlins || 3-5 || Willis (1-0) || Drese (0-2) || Borowski (1) || 12,913 || 2-9
|-  style="background:#bfb;"
| 12 || April 15 || @ Florida Marlins || 2-1 || Patterson (1-0) || Olsen (0-1) || Cordero (1) || 15,668 || 3-9
|-  style="background:#bfb;"
| 13 || April 16 || @ Florida Marlins || 7-5 || Majewski (1-0) || Herges (0-1) || Cordero (2) || 10,296 || 4-9
|-  style="background:#bfb;"
| 14 || April 18 || @ Philadelphia Phillies || 10-3 || Armas (1-2) || Lidle (1-2) || || 20,072 || 5-9
|-  style="background:#fbb;"
| 15 || April 19 || @ Philadelphia Phillies || 6-7 || Franklin (1-1) || Stanton (0-2) || || 27,913 || 5-10
|-  style="background:#bfb;"
| 16 || April 20 || @ Philadelphia Phillies || 10-4 || Traber (1-0) || Madson (1-1) || || 28,177 || 6-10
|-  style="background:#bfb;"
| 17 || April 21 || Atlanta Braves || 7-3 || Stanton (1-2) || Cormier (0-1) || || 24,597 || 7-10
|-  style="background:#bbb;"
| || April 22 || Atlanta Braves || colspan=6 |Postponed (rain) 
|-  style="background:#fbb;"
| 18 || April 23 || Atlanta Braves || 1-3 || Cormier (1-1) || Majewski (1-1) || Remlinger (1) || 21,569 || 7-11
|-  style="background:#fbb;"
| 19 || April 24 || Cincinnati Reds || 2-4 || Ramírez (1-0) || Hernández (1-3) || Weathers (5) || 19,263 || 7-12
|-  style="background:#fbb;"
| 20 || April 25 || Cincinnati Reds || 5-6 || Williams (1-2) || Traber (1-1) || Weathers (6) || 21,642 || 7-13
|-  style="background:#fbb;"
| 21 || April 26 || Cincinnati Reds || 0-5 || Arroyo (4-0) || Ortiz (0-3) || || 19,380 || 7-14
|-  style="background:#fbb;"
| 22 || April 27 || @ St. Louis Cardinals || 2-6 || Ponson (3-0) || O'Connor (0-1) || || 39,515 || 7-15
|-  style="background:#bfb;"
| 23 || April 28 || @ St. Louis Cardinals || 8-3 || Armas (2-2) || Marquis (3-2) || || 40,841 || 8-15
|-  style="background:#fbb;"
| 24 || April 29 || @ St. Louis Cardinals || 1-2 || Looper (2-0) || Rauch (0-1) || Isringhausen (7) || 39,596 || 8-16
|-  style="background:#fbb;"
| 25 || April 30 || @ St. Louis Cardinals || 2-9 || Suppan (2-2) || Day (1-3) || || 39,383 || 8-17

|-  style="background:#fbb;"
| 26 || May 1 || @ New York Mets || 1-2 || Wagner (2-0) || Majewski (1-2) || || 28,310 || 8-18
|-  style="background:#bfb;"
| 27 || May 2 || @ New York Mets || 6-2 || O'Connor (1-1) || Maine (0-1) || || 34,046 || 9-18
|-  style="background:#fbb;"
| 28 || May 3 || Florida Marlins || 5-6 || Nolasco (2-1) || Stanton (1-3) || Borowski (4) || 21,918 || 9-19
|-  style="background:#fbb;"
| 29 || May 4 || Florida Marlins || 3-11 || Johnson (2-2) || Hernández (1-4) || || 20,984 || 9-20
|-  style="background:#bfb;"
| 30 || May 5 || Pittsburgh Pirates || 6-0 || Day (2-3) || Pérez (1-5) || || 21,059 || 10-20
|-  style="background:#fbb;"
| 31 || May 6 || Pittsburgh Pirates || 4-5 || Gonzalez (1-2) || Rodriguez (0-1) || || 29,953 || 10-21
|-  style="background:#bfb;"
| 32 || May 7 || Pittsburgh Pirates || 5-4 || O'Connor (2-1) || Duke (2-3) || Cordero (3) || 30,659 || 11-21
|-  style="background:#bfb;"
| 33 || May 9 || @ Cincinnati Reds || 7-1 || Armas (3-2) || Claussen (2-4) || || 16,716 || 12-21
|-  style="background:#fbb;"
| 34 || May 10 || @ Cincinnati Reds || 6-9 || Weathers (1-1) || Stanton (1-4) || || 14,180 || 12-22
|-  style="background:#fbb;"
| 35 || May 11 || @ Cincinnati Reds || 4-5 || Shackelford (1-0) || Eischen (0-1) || || 16,716 || 12-23
|-  style="background:#fbb;"
| 36 || May 12 || @ Atlanta Braves || 2-6 || Smoltz (3-2) || Ortiz (0-4) || ||31,818 || 12-24
|-  style="background:#fbb;"
| 37 || May 13 || @ Atlanta Braves || 5-8 || Reitsma (1-1) || Cordero (1-1) || || 37,040 || 12-25
|-  style="background:#bfb;"
| 38 || May 14 || @ Atlanta Braves || 8-1 || Armas (4-2) || Thomson (1-3) || || 31,062 || 13-25
|-  style="background:#fbb;"
| 39 || May 16 || @ Chicago Cubs || 0-4 || Zambrano (2-2) || Hernández (1-5) || || 39,298 || 13-26
|-  style="background:#fbb;"
| 40 || May 17 || @ Chicago Cubs || 0-5 || Marshall (3-1) || Day (2-4) || || 39,757 || 13-27
|-  style="background:#bfb;"
| 41 || May 18 || @ Chicago Cubs || 5-3 || Ortiz (1-4) || Wood (0-1) || Cordero (4) || 40,517 || 14-27
|-  style="background:#fbb;"
| 42 || May 19 || Baltimore Orioles || 1-5 || Benson (6-3) || O'Connor (2-2) || || 30,320 || 14-28
|-  style="background:#bfb;"
| 43 || May 20 || Baltimore Orioles || 8-3 || Rauch (1-1) || Lopez (1-7) || || 32,502 || 15-28
|-  style="background:#bfb;"
| 44 || May 21 || Baltimore Orioles || 3-1 || Hernández (5-2) || Chen (0-5) || Cordero (5) || 32,152 || 16-28
|-  style="background:#fbb;"
| 45 || May 22 || Houston Astros || 3-10 || Rodríguez (6-2) || Day (2-5) || || 18,803 || 16-29
|-  style="background:#bfb;"
| 46 || May 23 || Houston Astros || 4-1 || Ortiz (2-4) || Nieve (1-3) || Cordero (6) || 23,189 || 17-29
|-  style="background:#bfb;"
| 47 || May 24 || Houston Astros || 5-1 || Majewski (2-2) || Wheeler (0-3) || || 24,194 || 18-29
|-  style="background:#bfb;"
| 48 || May 25 || Houston Astros || 8-5 || Armas (5-2) || Pettitte (3-6) || Cordero (7) || 24,733 || 19-29
|-  style="background:#bfb;"
| 49 || May 26 || Los Angeles Dodgers || 10-4 || Hernández (3-5) || Tomko (5-2) || || 22,712 || 20-29
|-  style="background:#fbb;"
| 50 || May 27 || Los Angeles Dodgers || 1-3 || Lowe (3-3) || Stanton (1-5) || Saito (2) || 26,867 || 20-30
|-  style="background:#bfb;"
| 51 || May 28 || Los Angeles Dodgers || 10-4 || Ortiz (3-4) || Seo (2-3) || || 30,348 || 21-30
|-  style="background:#fbb;"
| 52 || May 29 || @ Philadelphia Phillies || 2-11 || Condrey (1-0) || O'Connor (2-3) || || 33,682 || 21-31
|-  style="background:#fbb;"
| 53 || May 30 || @ Philadelphia Phillies || 2-4 || Myers (4-2) || Armas (5-3) || Gordon (15) || 23,805 || 21-32
|-  style="background:#bfb;"
| 54 || May 31 || @ Philadelphia Phillies || 3-2 || Hernández (4-5) || Lidle (4-5) || Cordero (8) || 30,386 || 22-32

|-  style="background:#bfb;"
| 55 || June 2 || @ Milwaukee Brewers || 10-4 || Ortiz (4-4) || Eveland (0-3) || || 21,476 || 23-32
|-  style="background:#bfb;"
| 56 || June 3 || @ Milwaukee Brewers || 4-3 || Bray (1-0) || Turnbow (2-3) || Cordero (9) || 40,392 || 24-32
|-  style="background:#bfb;"
| 57 || June 4 || @ Milwaukee Brewers || 8-4 || Armas (6-3) || de la Rosa (2-2) || || 21,608 || 25-32
|-  style="background:#bfb;"
| 58 || June 5 || @ Atlanta Braves || 5-4 || Hernández (5-5) || Hudson (5-4) || Cordero (10) || 20,702 || 26-32
|-  style="background:#fbb;"
| 59 || June 6 || @ Atlanta Braves || 3-5 || Ramírez (2-1) || Hill (0-1) || Ray (3) || 23,497 || 26-33
|-  style="background:#bfb;"
| 60 || June 7 || @ Atlanta Braves || 5-2 || Ortiz (5-4) || Smoltz (4-4) || Cordero (11) || 32,001 || 27-33
|-  style="background:#bfb;"
| 61 || June 8 || Philadelphia Phillies || 5-2 || O'Connor (3-3) || Brito (0-2) || Cordero (12) || 24,669 || 28-33
|-  style="background:#bfb;"
| 62 || June 9 || Philadelphia Phillies || 9-8 || Cordero (2-1) || Condrey (1-1) || || 24,751 || 29-33
|-  style="background:#fbb;"
| 63 || June 10 || Philadelphia Phillies || 2-6 || Geary (4-0) || Hernández (5-6) || || 32,089 || 29-34
|-  style="background:#bfb;"
| 64 || June 11 || Philadelphia Phillies || 6-0 || Hill (1-1) || Hamels (1-1) || || 30,583 || 30-34
|-  style="background:#fbb;"
| 65 || June 12 || Colorado Rockies || 3-4 || Francis (5-5) || Ramón Ortiz (5-5) || Fuentes (14) || 20,633 || 30-35
|-  style="background:#fbb;"
| 66 || June 13 || Colorado Rockies || 2-9 || Fogg (4-4) || O'Connor (3-4) || || 21,689 || 30-36
|-  style="background:#fbb;"
| 67 || June 14 || Colorado Rockies || 8-14 || Martin (1-0) || Bray (1-1) || || 24,273 || 30-37
|-  style="background:#fbb;"
| 68 || June 15 || Colorado Rockies || 1-8 || Jennings (5-6) || Hernández (5-7) || || 22,793 || 30-38
|-  style="background:#fbb;"
| 69 || June 16 || New York Yankees || 5-7 || Rivera (4-3) || Cordero (2-2) || || 44,749 || 30-39
|-  style="background:#bfb;"
| 70 || June 17 || New York Yankees || 11-9 || Rauch (2-1) || Rivera (4-4) || Cordero (13) || 45,085 || 31-39
|-  style="background:#bfb;"
| 71 || June 18 || New York Yankees || 3-2 || Majewski (3-2) || Wang (7-3) || || 45,157 || 32-39
|-  style="background:#fbb;"
| 72 || June 19 || @ Boston Red Sox || 3-6 || Snyder (1-0) || Armas (6-4) || Timlin (1) || 36,252 || 32-40
|-  style="background:#fbb;"
| 73 || June 20 || @ Boston Red Sox || 3-11 || Wakefield (5-8) || Hernández (5-8) || || 36,421 || 32-41
|-  style="background:#fbb;"
| 74 || June 21 || @ Boston Red Sox || 3-9 || Lester (2-0) || Hill (1-2) || || 36,464 || 32-42
|-  style="background:#fbb;"
| 75 || June 23 || @ Baltimore Orioles || 1-2 || Lopez (5-8) || Patterson (1-1) || Ray (19) || 48,331 || 32-43
|-  style="background:#fbb;"
| 76 || June 24 || @ Baltimore Orioles || 2-3 || Williams (2-3) || Cordero (2-3) || || 36,290 || 32-44
|-  style="background:#bfb;"
| 77 || June 25 || @ Baltimore Orioles || 9-5 || Hernández (6-8) || Cabrera (4-5) || || 27,680 || 33-44
|-  style="background:#fbb;"
| 78 || June 27 || @ Toronto Blue Jays || 0-6 || Burnett (1-1) || Ortiz (5-6) || || 20,228 || 33-45
|-  style="background:#fbb;"
| 79 || June 28 || @ Toronto Blue Jays || 1-6 || Lilly (8-7) || Hill (1-3) || || 17,067 || 33-46
|-  style="background:#fbb;"
| 80 || June 29 || @ Toronto Blue Jays || 4-8 || Halladay (10-2) || Patterson (1-2) || || 17,175 || 33-47
|-  style="background:#fbb;"
| 81 || June 30 || Tampa Bay Devil Rays || 1-11 || Corcoran (2-0) || O'Connor (3-5) || || 21,854 || 33-48

|-  style="background:#bfb;"
| 82 || July 1 || Tampa Bay Devil Rays || 4-3  || Cordero (3-3) || Meadows (2-2) || || 21,515 || 34-48
|-  style="background:#bfb;"
| 83 || July 2 || Tampa Bay Devil Rays || 6-2 || Ortiz (6-6) || Seo (2-5) || || 23,823 || 35-48
|-  style="background:#bfb;"
| 84 || July 3 || Florida Marlins || 9-1 || Astacio (1-0) || Nolasco (6-5) || || 24,943 || 36-48
|-  style="background:#bfb;"
| 85 || July 4 || Florida Marlins || 6-4 || Cordero (4-3) || Borowski (0-2) || || 23,118 || 37-48
|-  style="background:#fbb;"
| 86 || July 5 || Florida Marlins || 9-18 || Petit (1-1) || O'Connor (3-6) || Pinot (1) || 18,441 || 37-49
|-  style="background:#bfb;"
| 87 || July 6 || Florida Marlins || 8-7  || Cordero (5-3) || Vargas (1-2) || || 29,053 || 38-49
|-  style="background:#fbb;"
| 88 || July 7 || San Diego Padres || 2-3 || Williams (4-1) || Ortiz (6-7) || Hoffman (23) || 25,161 || 38-50
|-  style="background:#fbb;"
| 89 || July 8 || San Diego Padres || 2-5 || Young (8-4) || Astacio (1-1) || Hoffman (24) || 27,060 || 38-51
|-  style="background:#fbb;"
| 90 || July 9 || San Diego Padres || 9-10 || Cassidy (5-4) || Cordero (5-4) || Linebrink (1) || 22,000 || 38-52
|- style="background:#bbb;"
|colspan=9| All–Star Break (July 10–12)
|-  style="background:#fbb;"
| 91 || July 14 || @ Pittsburgh Pirates || 4-7 || Duke (6-8) || Ortiz (6-8) || Gonzalez (14) || 26,720 || 38-53
|-  style="background:#fbb;"
| 92 || July 15 || @ Pittsburgh Pirates || 6-7 || Gonzalez (3-3) || Corcoran (0-1) || || 32,626 || 38-54
|-  style="background:#bfb;"
| 93 || July 16 || @ Pittsburgh Pirates || 8-4 || Stanton (2-5) || Hernández (0-3) || || 18,908 || 39-54
|-  style="background:#fbb;"
| 94 || July 17 || @ Florida Marlins || 2-4 || Nolasco (7-6) || Armas (6-5) || Borowski (18) || 7,562 || 39-55
|-  style="background:#bfb;"
| 95 || July 18 || @ Florida Marlins || 7-6 || Stanton (3-5) || Kensing (1-3) || Cordero (14) || 11,247 || 40-55
|-  style="background:#fbb;"
| 96 || July 19 || @ Florida Marlins || 0-1 || Sánchez (3-0) || Ortiz (6-9) || Borowski (19) || 25,546 || 40-56
|-  style="background:#bfb;"
| 97 || July 21 || Chicago Cubs || 7-6 || Rauch (3-1) || Howry (3-3) || Cordero (15) || 35,442 || 41-56
|-  style="background:#bfb;"
| 98 || July 22 || Chicago Cubs || 7-3 || Hernández (7-8) || Williamson (2-3) || || 38,021 || 42-56
|-  style="background:#bfb;"
| 99 || July 23 || Chicago Cubs || 7-1 || Armas (7-5) || Mármol (3-4) || || 30,851 || 43-56
|-  style="background:#bfb;"
| 100 || July 25 || San Francisco Giants || 8-6 || Ortiz (7-9) || Morris (8-8) || Cordero (16) || 33,358 || 44-56
|-  style="background:#bfb;"
| 101 || July 26 || San Francisco Giants || 4-3 || Rivera (1-0) || Benítez (4-2) || || 30,248 || 45-56
|-  style="background:#bfb;"
| 102 || July 27 || San Francisco Giants || 6-5 || Hernández (8-8) || Cain (7-7) || Cordero (17) || 29,717 || 46-56
|-  style="background:#fbb;"
| 103 || July 28 || @ Los Angeles Dodgers || 1-13 || Billingsley (2-3) || Armas (7-6) || || 55,825 || 46-57
|-  style="background:#fbb;"
| 104 || July 29 || @ Los Angeles Dodgers || 5-7 || Lowe (8-7) || O'Connor (3-7) || Broxton (1) || 41,540 || 46-58
|-  style="background:#fbb;"
| 105 || July 30 || @ Los Angeles Dodgers || 3-4 || Broxton (2-0) || Rauch (3-2) || Saito (9) || 43,346 || 46-59
|-  style="background:#bfb;"
| 106 || July 31 || @ San Francisco Giants || 10-7 || Astacio (2-1) || Lowry (5-7) || Cordero (18) || 37,106 || 47-59

|-  style="background:#bfb;"
| 107 || August 1 || @ San Francisco Giants || 4-1 || Hernández (9-8) || Cain (7-8) || Cordero (19) || 37,258 || 48-59
|-  style="background:#fbb;"
| 108 || August 2 || @ San Francisco Giants || 6-8 || Schmidt (8-7) || Armas (7-7) || Stanton (1) || 38,283 || 48-60
|-  style="background:#bfb;"
| 109 || August 4 || @ San Diego Padres || 6-2 || Ortiz (8-9) || Young (9-5) || || 36,538 || 49-58
|-  style="background:#fbb;"
| 110 || August 5 || @ San Diego Padres || 3-6 || Embree (4-2) || Astacio (2-2) || Hoffman (30) || 40,339 || 49-61
|-  style="background:#fbb;"
| 111 || August 6 || @ San Diego Padres || 2-3 || Brocail (2-0) || Bowie (0-1) || || 35,648 || 49-62
|-  style="background:#fbb;"
| 112 || August 8 || Florida Marlins || 2-4 || Nolasco (10-7) || Armas (7-8) || Borowski (23) || 24,922 || 49-63
|-  style="background:#bfb;"
| 113 || August 9 || Florida Marlins || 5-2 || Ortiz (9-9) || Willis (7-9) || Cordero (20) || 21,390 || 50-63
|-  style="background:#fbb;"
| 114 || August 10 || Florida Marlins || 6-9 || Moehler (6-8) || Wagner (0-1) || Borowski (24) || 21,304 || 50-64
|-  style="background:#bfb;"
| 115 || August 11 || New York Mets || 2-1 || Traber (2-1) || Glavine (12-5) || Cordero (21) || 29,414 || 51-64
|-  style="background:#fbb;"
| 116 || August 12 || New York Mets || 4-6 || Feliciano (5-2) || Schroder (0-1) || Wagner (27) || 42,507 || 51-65
|-  style="background:#fbb;"
| 117 || August 13 || New York Mets || 1-3 || Bradford (4-2) || Rauch (3-3) || Wagner (28) || 37,732 || 51-66
|-  style="background:#fbb;"
| 118 || August 14 || Atlanta Braves || 4-10 || James (5-3) || Ortiz (9-10) || || 21,550 || 51-67
|-  style="background:#bfb;"
| 119 || August 15 || Atlanta Braves || 5-0 || Astacio (3-2) || Cormier (2-4) || || 24,036 || 52-67
|-  style="background:#bfb;"
| 120 || August 16 || Atlanta Braves || 9-6 || Traber (3-1) || Smoltz (10-6) || Cordero (22) || 28,094 || 53-67
|-  style="background:#fbb;"
| 121 || August 17 || Atlanta Braves || 0-5 || Villarreal (9-1) || Bergmann (0-1) || || 29,007 || 53-68
|-  style="background:#bfb;"
| 122 || August 18 || @ Philadelphia Phillies || 6-4 || Armas (8-8) || Myers (8-6) || Cordero (23) || 30,123 || 54-68
|-  style="background:#fbb;"
| 123 || August 19 || @ Philadelphia Phillies || 2-11 || Hamels (6-6) || Ortiz (9-11) || || 34,881 || 54-69
|-  style="background:#fbb;"
| 124 || August 20 || @ Philadelphia Phillies || 10-12 || Wolf (2-0) || Astacio (3-3) || Rhodes (2) || 36,023 || 54-70
|-  style="background:#fbb;"
| 125 || August 21 || @ Florida Marlins || 1-3 || Sánchez (5-2) || Traber (3-2) || Borowski (28) || 9,316 || 54-71
|-  style="background:#fbb;"
| 126 || August 22 || @ Florida Marlins || 5-7 || Tankersley (2-1) || Wagner (0-2) || Borowski (29) || 10,260 || 54-72
|-  style="background:#fbb;"
| 127 || August 23 || @ Florida Marlins || 7-9 || Olsen (10-7) || Armas (8-9) || || 11,318 || 54-73
|-  style="background:#bfb;"
| 128 || August 25 || @ Atlanta Braves || 7-6 || Wagner (1-2) || Paronto (1-2) || Rivera (1) || 33,621 || 55-73
|-  style="background:#fbb;"
| 129 || August 26 || @ Atlanta Braves || 1-10 || Smoltz (12-6) || Astacio (3-4) || || 38,610 || 55-74
|-  style="background:#fbb;"
| 130 || August 27 || @ Atlanta Braves || 6-13 || McBride (4-1) || Traber (3-3) || || 30,587 || 55-75
|-  style="background:#fbb;"
| 131 || August 29 || Philadelphia Phillies || 6-10 || Myers (10-6) || Armas (8-10) || Rhodes (4) || 25,735 || 55-76
|-  style="background:#fbb;"
| 132 || August 30 || Philadelphia Phillies || 1-5 || Hamels (7-7) || Ortiz (9-12) || || 24,438 || 55-77
|-  style="background:#bfb;"
| 133 || August 31 || Philadelphia Phillies || 6-5 || Wagner (2-2) || Fultz (3-1) || || 22,221 || 56-77

|-  style="background:#bbb;"
| || September 1 || Arizona Diamondbacks || colspan=6 |Postponed (rain) 
|-  style="background:#bfb;"
| 134 || September 2  || Arizona Diamondbacks || 7-6 || Cordero (6-4) || Lyon (2-4) || || 22,012 || 57-77
|-  style="background:#bfb;"
| 135 || September 2  || Arizona Diamondbacks || 4-3 || Rivera || Hernández (10-12) || Cordero (24) || 22,922 || 58-77
|-  style="background:#bfb;"
| 136 || September 3 || Arizona Diamondbacks || 5-3 || Wagner (3-2) || Webb (14-6) || Rauch (1) || 30,771 || 59-77
|-  style="background:#bfb;"
| 137 || September 4 || St. Louis Cardinals || 4-1 || Ortiz (10-12) || Marquis (14-13) || || 31,092 || 60-77
|-  style="background:#fbb;"
| 138 || September 5 || St. Louis Cardinals || 0-2 || Suppan (11-7) || Astacio (3-5) || Isringhausen (33) || 25,937 || 60-78
|-  style="background:#bfb;"
| 139 || September 6 || St. Louis Cardinals || 7-6 || Cordero (7-4) || Isringhausen (4-8) || || 21,322 || 61-78
|-  style="background:#fbb;"
| 140 || September 7 || @ Colorado Rockies || 5-10 || Corpas (1-1) || Wagner (3-3) || || 18,617 || 61-79
|-  style="background:#fbb;"
| 141 || September 8 || @ Colorado Rockies || 8-11 || Field (1-1) || Rauch (3-4) || Fuentes (24) || 22,214 || 61-80
|-  style="background:#fbb;"
| 142 || September 9 || @ Colorado Rockies || 5-9 || Venafro (1-0) || Ortiz (10-13) || || 22,735 || 61-81
|-  style="background:#fbb;"
| 143 || September 10 || @ Colorado Rockies || 9-13 || Mesa (1-5) || Schroder (0-2) || Fuentes (25) || 18,647 || 61-82
|-  style="background:#bfb;"
| 144 || September 11 || @ Arizona Diamondbacks || 7-6 || Rauch (4-4) || Vizcaíno (4-5) || Cordero (25) || 29,610 || 62-82
|-  style="background:#bfb;"
| 145 || September 12 || @ Arizona Diamondbacks || 5-4 || Rodríguez (1-1) || Peña (3-4) || Cordero (26) || 31,182 || 63-82
|-  style="background:#fbb;"
| 146 || September 13 || @ Arizona Diamondbacks || 2-4 || Hernández (12-12) || Armas (8-11) || Valverde (16) || 19,031 || 63-83
|-  style="background:#fbb;"
| 147 || September 15 || Milwaukee Brewers || 2-5 || Villanueva (1-1) || Ortiz (10-14) || Cordero (19) || 21,168 || 63-84
|-  style="background:#bfb;"
| 148 || September 16 || Milwaukee Brewers || 8-5 || Astacio (4-5) || Bush (11-11) || Cordero (27) || 24,252 || 64-84
|-  style="background:#bfb;"
| 149 || September 17 || Milwaukee Brewers || 6-1 || Rivera (3-0) || Davis (10-11) || || 26,128 || 65-84
|-  style="background:#fbb;"
| 150 || September 18 || Atlanta Braves || 1-6 || Davies (3-5) || Armas (8-12) || || 25,211 || 65-85
|-  style="background:#bfb;"
| 151 || September 19 || Atlanta Braves || 9-2 || Pérez (1-0) || James (10-4) || || 20,596 || 66-85
|-  style="background:#fbb;"
| 152 || September 20 || Atlanta Braves || 3-7 || Cormier (4-5) || Ortiz (10-15) || || 19,027 || 66-86
|-  style="background:#bfb;"
| 153 || September 22 || @ New York Mets || 3-2 || Astacio (5-5) || Hernández (10-11) || Cordero (28) || 42,788 || 67-86
|-  style="background:#fbb;"
| 154 || September 23 || @ New York Mets || 6-12 || Maine (6-5) || O'Connor (3-8) || || 45,245 || 67-87
|-  style="background:#bfb;"
| 155 || September 24 || @ New York Mets || 5-1 || Armas (9-12) || Trachsel (15-8) || || 44,543 || 68-87
|-  style="background:#bfb;"
| 156 || September 25 || @ New York Mets || 7-3 || Pérez (2-0) || Glavine (14-7) || || 34,027 || 69-87
|-  style="background:#bfb;"
| 157 || September 26 || Philadelphia Phillies || 4-3 || Ortiz (11-15) || Myers (12-7) || Corero (29) || 18,960 || 70-87
|-  style="background:#fbb;"
| 158 || September 27 || Philadelphia Phillies || 7-8 || Condrey (2-2) || Bergmann (0-2) || Castro (1) || 21,809 || 70-88
|-  style="background:#bfb;"
| 159 || September 28 || Philadelphia Phillies || 3-1 || Traber (4-3) || Lieber (9-11) || Rauch (2) || 18,324 || 71-88
|-  style="background:#fbb;"
| 160 || September 29 || New York Mets || 3-4 || Feliciano (7-2) || Rauch (4-5) || Wagner (40)  || 27,805 || 71-89
|-  style="background:#fbb;"
| 161 || September 30 || New York Mets || 0-13 || Glavine (15-7) || Pérez (2-1) || || 30,449 || 71-90

|-  style="background:#fbb;"
| 162 || October 1 || New York Mets || 2-6 || Mota (4-3) || Ortiz (11-16) || || 29,044 || 71-91

Player stats

Batting
Note: Pos = Position; G = Games played; AB = At bats; R = Runs scored; H = Hits; 2B = Doubles; 3B = Triples; HR = Home runs; RBI = Runs batted in; AVG = Batting average; SB = Stolen bases

Complete offensive statistics are available here.

Pitching
Note: Pos = Position; W = Wins; L = Losses; ERA = Earned run average; G = Games pitched; GS = Games started; SV = Saves; IP = Innings pitched; R = Runs allowed; ER = Earned runs allowed; BB = Walks allowed; K = Strikeouts

Complete pitching statistics are available here.

Team leaders

Qualifying players only.

Batting

Pitching

Awards and honors

All-Stars
 Alfonso Soriano, OF

Annual awards
 Silver Slugger: Alfonso Soriano, OF

Farm system

References

2006 Washington Nationals season at Baseball Reference
2006 Washington Nationals season at Baseball Almanac

Washington Nationals seasons
Washington Nationals
Nat